Ms .45 (also known as Angel of Vengeance or Ms. 45) is a 1981 American exploitation thriller film directed by Abel Ferrara and starring Zoë Tamerlis.

Inspired by films such as Thriller – A Cruel Picture (1973), Death Wish (1974), and Taxi Driver (1976), the film is a rape and revenge story about Thana, a mute woman who becomes a spree killer after she is raped twice in one day when going home from work. It was critically detested on its theatrical release, but is now generally highly regarded among fans of underground and independent film.

It was acquired by Alamo Drafthouse Films in October 2013 and remastered in HD from the original negatives. The distributor released the film on Blu-ray, DVD, and digital copy in March 2014.

Plot
While walking home from work, Thana, a mute seamstress in New York City's Garment District, is raped at gunpoint in an alley by a masked attacker. She survives and returns to her apartment, where she is raped a second time by a burglar. Thana strikes this second assailant with a small glass apple, then bludgeons him to death with an iron, and carries his body to the bathtub. The next day at work, Thana goes into shock after watching her boss Albert rip a shirt off a mannequin, which worries her co-workers. She later decides to dismember the burglar's corpse and scatter the parts across various locations in the city.

After being sent home, she dismembers the burglar's body, keeping his .45 caliber pistol. Thana places the pieces of the body into plastic garbage bags and stores them in her fridge. After cleaning her bathtub, she decides to take a shower, but as she strips, she hallucinates the first attacker in the mirror grabbing her breast, horrifying her. She also notices that organs and body fluids from the burglar are overflowing in the drain. Mrs. Nasone, her nosy neighbor and the landlady, is an elderly, recently widowed woman. She and her small dog Phil begin to notice Thana's odd behavior.

The next day, while disposing of one of the bagged body parts, Thana is noticed by a leering young man on the street. Thinking that she accidentally dropped the bag, he retrieves it, frightening her. He chases her through the alleys of the city and, fearing another sexual assault, she fatally shoots him when she is cornered by him. Following the incident, Mrs. Nasone notices Thana rushed up the stairs and started throwing up. She insists on calling a doctor for Thana. Meanwhile, Mrs. Nasone's dog, Phil, starts to become attracted to her fridge. Thana escorts her out of her apartment while still in shock.

As the limbs start to attract the attention of the media, Albert brings her into his office and notices she has not been sewing enough and has not been feeling well lately. He invites her to a Halloween party that he is throwing for work, and tells her that there will be "many boys there [her] age", while stroking her neck. She responds to him in writing, saying, "I'll try". As Thana's quest of vengeance increases, she starts regularly targeting and killing several men, including an arrogant fashion photographer, a pimp who assaults a prostitute, several members of a gang seeking to sexually assault her, a Saudi Arabian businessman and his limousine driver, and even drives a recently dumped salesman to suicide after her gun jams.

Thana's boss, Albert, notices her ditching work after going to dinner with her co-workers, resulting in her co-workers having to finish her work. She promises to go to the party with him in exchange for staying out of trouble for her absence. Thana notices that Phil is attracted to the smell of the burglar's dismembered limbs. Thana takes Phil for a walk then ties him to a post in the park. She leaves a note saying that Phil ran away but will probably find his way back home soon.

With Albert, Thana attends the costume party dressed as a nun. Meanwhile, Mrs. Nasone enters Thana's apartment and finds the burglar's dismembered head. She assumes that Thana killed her dog, and tells police that she is at a party with her co-workers. At the party, Albert takes Thana upstairs in private and attempts to seduce her. In response, she shoots him. The party stops and her co-workers run upstairs to Thana, but quickly realize that she is the murderer when she steps out of the room with her pistol. Thana begins a shooting spree, targeting many of the men present. Her co-worker Laurie picks up a nearby knife and stabs Thana in the back. Thana turns around and points the gun at Laurie, but hesitates; she screams in pain, "Sister!" then falls to the ground and dies.

Following the party massacre, a tearful Mrs. Nasone attends a memorial for her husband and her dog Phil. Unbeknownst to her, Phil makes its way back, scratching at her apartment door.

Cast

Production

Principal photography for the film took place over the course of four weeks in February and March 1980.

Many years later Zoë Tamerlis described how minimal the script was, which is uncharacteristic of Ferrara's later films.

Reception
On review aggregator website Rotten Tomatoes, Ms .45 holds an "fresh" approval rating of 85% based on 34 reviews, with an average rating of 7.4/10. On Metacritic, the film has a score of 62 out of 100 based on 6 critics, indicating "Generally favorable reviews".

Home media
In 1983, the film was released on VHS by U.S.A. Home Video in its uncut form. Ms .45 was released on DVD in the United States on April 25, 2000, by Image Entertainment, but was re-edited for DVD release. The re-edit removes less than a minute, total. The cuts include changes to the first rape, featuring Ferrara's cameo, which is split by an insert shot from a later scene. The second rape is more drastically cut, omitting the line, "This oughta make you talk, huh?" The climactic Halloween party shootout was also re-cut to remove an onscreen murder, which now occurs offscreen.

The uncut DVD, Blu-ray, digital copy was released in the US by Drafthouse Films.

In popular culture
In the sixth episode of the HBO teen drama Euphoria first season, the character Kat Hernandez, portrayed by Barbie Ferreira, dresses up as Thana for Halloween.

Notes

References

External links
 
 
 

1981 films
1981 crime films
1981 independent films
1981 thriller films
1980s American films
1980s crime thriller films
1980s English-language films
1980s exploitation films
1980s feminist films
American crime thriller films
American exploitation films
American feminist films
American independent films
American neo-noir films
American rape and revenge films
American vigilante films
Films about disability
Films directed by Abel Ferrara
Films scored by Joe Delia
Films set in New York City
Films shot in New York City
Girls with guns films